Arena Corinthians, also known as the Neo Química Arena for sponsorship reasons, is a sports stadium located in São Paulo, Brazil, owned, operated and used by Corinthians.

It hosted six matches during the 2014 FIFA World Cup, including the opening match on 12 June 2014. Because of a requirement for it to have at least 65,000 seats for the World Cup opening match, temporary seats were added to the stadium for the tournament. The temporary seats started to be removed shortly after its last World Cup match.

History

Background 

In 1980, Corinthians was planning to build a new 201,304-capacity stadium, as their own Alfredo Schürig Stadium, also known as Parque São Jorge, held fewer than 14,000 people and the city's Pacaembu Stadium had to be shared with other teams. Plans to build a new stadium required a large area. The club's president Vicente Matheus asked for a concession from São Paulo's mayor Olavo Setúbal in the Itaquera region, east of the city centre. The mayor accepted the request 10 November 1978 and a concession for 90 years was granted on 26 December 1978 for a  property. The area was owned at the time by COHAB, an agency for public housing controlled by the São Paulo City government. The original plan was to build the stadium in three to five years. The concession was renewed in 1988 for 90 years, with the condition that any construction made in the area would revert to the city at no cost. However, funding was not obtained and other alternatives were considered, such as a concession for the Pacaembu Stadium and demolishing the Alfredo Schürig Stadium making room for another.

On 31 August 2010, Corinthians announced the construction of the stadium with an estimated cost of R$335 million and an expected gross revenue of R$100 million per year. The original plans allow for an expansion to 70,000 seats. The club expected to get financing from BNDES and sell the naming rights for the stadium to pay for the construction costs. The main architect of the project was Aníbal Coutinho; he was assisted by Antônio Paulo Cordeiro from Coutinho, Diegues, Cordeiro (DDG), partnering with Werner Sobek, who rendered structural engineering services. The stadium was planned to be completed by March 2013.

FIFA World Cup 2014 hosting 

Accenture estimated that the World Cup opening would bring R$30.75 Billion over 10 years to the city's economy; the study's results encouraged Brazil to site the opening match in São Paulo. A study from Fundação Getúlio Vargas estimated R$1 Billion in revenue during the World Cup, as 290 thousand tourists were expected for the event. After Morumbi Stadium was deemed unsuitable by FIFA, the Local World Cup Committee looked for alternatives and set on offering Arena Corinthians to host the opening game; FIFA accepted the suggestion and confirmed the decision on 10 October 2011. Hosting the opening game required modifications to the project that raised the cost from the original R$335 million to R$1.07 billion to accommodate FIFA's requirements. Cuts in equipment, furniture and construction costs reduced the cost. Because of FIFA's agreements with Brazil, none of the construction work related to the World Cup was taxed by the Federal Government; the final price agreed upon was R$820 million.

A new contract was signed on 19 July 2011 with Odebrecht; R$400 million of the total would be financed by BNDES and the remaining R$420 million would come from tax credits granted by the city. A 2007 law stated the tax credits could be used by any company that established itself in the Eastern region of the city, providing a credit of R$0.60 per R$1.00 invested. A new law was passed by the city legislature to deal specifically with this stadium and reduce the incentives, linking the concession of the credits to hosting the World Cup opening match and limiting the total amount of credits to R$420 million. The concession was justified by the expectation that the stadium will generate R$950 million in city taxes during the six years after its opening. R$530 million in excess of the tax credits were given. The financing contract with BNDES was signed on 29 November 2013, under their ProCopas Arenas World Cup program. Caixa Econômica Federal is the distributing agent.

The estimated construction cost did not include the R$38.1 million required for adding temporary bleachers, which were removed after the World Cup was over. They were set on one of the sides and on the north and south ends. The addition of the bleachers would raise the stadium's capacity up to 72,000 seats, but would necessitate the relocation of VIP areas and television equipment reducing capacity. Corinthians paid for additional temporary infrastructure required exclusively for the World Cup, which was estimated to cost between R$60 million and 100 million.

The World Cup brought more than  tourists and an estimated R$1 billion in revenue to the city.

Project costs and revenue 

The stadium eventually cost R$965 million, 15% more than originally estimated. The two-year delay in receiving BNDES funds caused an increase of R$108 million to the cost because of the difference in interest between loans taken from regular banks and from the government agency. Temporary structures were included in the total cost, currently estimated to be R$77 million. After the sale of the tax credits received, Corinthians will have to pay between R$700 and R$750 million spread over 12 years. Aníbal Coutinho projected the stadium to generate R$150 million per year. Andres Sanchez expects revenue to reach R$200 million per year and expenses to be up to R$35 million per year. Revenue will come from ticket sales and commercial properties in the arena, especially corporate conventions, fairs and events. On 25 August 2013, Andres said that out of 16 naming rights properties, he had already secured seven buyers, although no deals had yet been formalised. The club plans to sell the stadium naming rights for R$400 million for 20 years.

Construction 

The stadium was delivered to Corinthians on 15 April 2014. Modifications for hosting the World Cup were still underway until the club handed the arena to FIFA for the competition on 20 May 2014. The peak number of workers on site was 2,300, recorded in November 2012. The enterprise generated 26 thousand jobs during its construction.

Renovations 

After the World Cup, Corinthians is preparing the stadium for their use; they consider it is 92% ready for their use just after the tournament. It is expected to be completely retrofitted by February 2015. The estimated cost is R$20 million. One of the largest changes will be the construction of large balconies and the installation of scoreboards behind the goals where the temporary seating installed for the FIFA World Cup stands.

Landscaping 

The west side will have a large, tree-lined, pedestrian mall with a reflecting pool and new illumination. The reflecting pools will also work as a performance fountain, providing splash and spectacle at programmed moments during stadium events. Around the complex, granite flooring will have stripes evocative of the club's second uniform, in synchronisation with the external illumination. There will be benches and large gardens; the media centre will be housed in one of them. The landscaping was designed by John Loomis, who headed the Burj Khalifa project. Lighting was projected by the American firm T. Kondos.

Stadium firsts 

The first event held in the arena was an Ivete Sangalo show for 3,000, celebrating the club's 103rd anniversary on 29 September 2013. The first public football matches at the stadium consisted of friendlies between former Corinthians players on 10 May 2014. More than 100 players played at the event.

The first goal at the new stadium was scored by Rivellino from a penalty kick conceded by Palhinha. Rivellino shot at his own goal because all the players on the pitch insisted that the first goal at the Arena was his. The kick went past Ronaldo. The first competitive game was a 2014 Campeonato Brasileiro Série A match between Corinthians and Figueirense on 18 May 2014. The first international match was the opening match for the FIFA World Cup 2014 between Brazil and Croatia on 12 June 2014.

International events

2014 FIFA World Cup 

The stadium was one of the venues for the 2014 FIFA World Cup. Because of FIFA rules, it was called Arena de São Paulo during the tournament. The stadium hosted the opening ceremony followed by the opening match between Brazil and Croatia, three other group stage matches, a Round 16 match and a semi-final. Because of the request of at least 65,000 seats for the World Cup opening match, temporary seats were added to the stadium for the tournament, although the final usable capacity only reached 62,200 for the opening match.

As the original screens were too large to be used with the temporary seating installed, temporary screens were rented specially for the World Cup. FIFA requires screens smaller than the originally projected, with a  area. Because subsequent matches had lower VIP and press demands, 4,000 more seats were added, raising the usable capacity to 66,200.

2016 Summer Olympics 
Arena Corinthians was one of the venues of the 2016 Summer Olympics football tournament. It was chosen instead of competitors Morumbi Stadiumthe chosen venue before Arena Corinthians was built and Allianz Parque. Sixteen games were played in the stadium from 3 to 16 August 2016; they were divided equally between men's and women's tournaments. Two matches were played at 17:00 and 21:30 hours on competition days. Twelve matches were valid for the preliminary stages and four for the quarterfinals. Semifinals and finals were played in the Maracanã Stadium.

Women's tournament

Men's tournament

2019 Copa América
Arena Corinthians was one of the venues of the 2019 Copa América.

Names 

The stadium was called Estádio do Corinthians by Corinthians when it was announced. The name being used on the club's official website is Arena Corinthians. The Brazilian Football Confederation uses the name Arena Corinthians. FIFA refers to the Stadium as Arena de São Paulo during the World Cup, but recognises the name Arena Corinthians. The largest media company in Brazil, Rede Globo, uses Arena Corinthians like sports diary Lance! Local media have tried to give it nicknames. For example, newspaper Folha refer to Arena Corinthians as Itaquerão; O Estado de S. Paulo uses both the neighbourhood-based nickname and the official name. Rede Record uses Fielzão.

The club planned to sell the stadium naming rights for R$400 million for 20 years. A study by Brunoro Sports Business estimated that the value should be R$21 million per year. Companies Petrobras, Ambev, Grupo Petrópolis, Etihad Airways, Qatar Foundation, Caixa Econômica Federal, Emirates Airlines, Bradesco, Telefonica, BMG, Itaú Unibanco, Santander Group, Kalunga and Zurich Insurance Group have all been named as possible buyers, but no deal had been announced yet.

On September 1, 2020 (Corinthians' 110th anniversary) a special event live from the stadium was held to announce the Arena's new name. It was officially renamed Neo Química Arena, part of a 20-year partnership with Hypera Pharma, Brazil's largest pharmaceutical company. Neo Química is Hypera's generic drugs division, which already served as Corinthians' main sponsor during the 2010 and 2011 seasons. The full contract is expected to be around R$300–320 million.

Architecture 
Aníbal Coutinho designed the stadium to be one "that would help the supporters, that would help the team to win matches, I wanted to make the supporters get on the pitch". Aníbal led a team of 25 architects. The complex is in a  property.

The pitch sits at exactly ; Aníbal Coutinho said, "The number 77 is considered lucky for the club. The club is located at 777 São Jorge St. and it brings to mind the 1977 that they won one of their most celebrated championships of all time." (the Campeonato Paulista of 1977).

West and east sectors 

The west side has a  façade. VIP seats, television crew equipment, press and most box seats are in the west building. The glass has been designed with a curvature intended to simulate the visual effect of a ball hitting the net. Special, seamless,  beams have been developed to support the structure. The geometry consulting company Evolute GmbH developed panelling that rationalised the  double-curved freeform glass surface into 855 planar and cylindrical panels, all in hot bent toughened glass. This solution allowed for minimising the number of shapes necessary by 93%, reducing costs considerably. The photo-voltaic glass powers the air conditioning.

The east side of the stadium houses one of the largest video screens of the world, —. The screen is manufactured by Osram Traxon and is controlled by an E:cue lighting control. Glass for both façades were provided by Italian company Sunglass SRL, using Asahi Glass Co.'s Planibel Clear glass.

The public circulates using 10 escalators, 15 lifts, two ramps and 13 staircases. 59 concession stands are available, as is an auditorium for 360 people and a  convention center under the west building. A museum dedicated to Corinthians will be set up in the east building.

Interior design is designed by Gensler. There are six changing rooms. Home team changing rooms occupy , with Jacuzzis, cryotherapy and a private area for the coach. The warm-up area has seating for 86 VIP ticket holders, and is separated by soundproof glass. All the public areas have air conditioning and are finished in marble, granite or top tier ceramic tile.

Seating 

There are  seats. The stadium has 6,000 second tier covered seating and 10,000 VIP seats.
89 luxury boxes accommodate 1,414 spectators. Distributed on the West building's 5th and 6th floors, 87% have 12 seats, 10% between 21 and 33 seats and 4 units more than 70 seats. The lowest ring of bleachers encircle the entire arena. It holds 10,500 seats on each side, 6,000 behind the south goal and 9,000 behind the north goal for a total of 35,000+ places.

General seating is provided by Bluecube³ using an exclusive design based on the Integra model. There are four different finishes, ranging from straight chairs without arms to stuffed chairs in leather. Most seats are white. Business level and box seats are finished in black leather and made by Poltrona Frau. The 600 seats have laser-engraved club crests.

Roof 

Werner Sobek designed the roof, which is held in place by 48 -long trusses. Aníbal Coutinho intended to bring a paulistano flair to the construction using structures that resemble the São Paulo Museum of Art, a symbol of the city. The height of the roof and weight of the trusses required the use of the largest crawler crane available in Latin America. The steel beams together weigh 4,000 tons.

The roof has four layers. On the underside is a layer of corrugated steel sheets. Above them, thermal and acoustic insulation is provided by Polyisocyanurate sheets. A layer of plasterboard is above it. On the underside, a flexible membrane covers the structure. This final layer helps to collect rainwater for reuse in other areas of the stadium.

The structure was redesigned to duplicate the current noise level supporters create during games. Measurements taken on Pacaembu show that sound levels reach a peak of 113dB when goals are scored.  of glass will be installed on the end closest to the pitch of the west and east roofing. The entire structure measures  and weights 6,500 tons.

Scoreboards 

Osram will install four scoreboards in the stadium, on the north and south ends, above the bleachers. They will be set in pairs, with one facing the pitch and one facing outside. The inside-facing screen will have a 7mm dot pitch and the outside-facing screens will have a 20mm dot pitch. 3,500 flat panel televisions are installed throughout the stadium, individually or as video walls, comprising 3,100 stations.

Lighting 
The pitch lighting is going to use 352 Osram Siteco 2000-Watt Metal-halide 6000K multivapour lamps, guaranteeing over 90% colour fidelity. The 5,000 lux lighting is completely uniform and is 50% brighter than FIFA's recommendation. Osram provides lighting for the entire complex.

Pitch 

It was prepared by World Sports in partnership with Desso. The field is made up of Perennial Ryegrass, which is grown directly at the site. The original idea was to use black grass to avoid the colours of PalmeirasCorinthians' biggest rivalsbut it was proved to be technically impossible and the club chose to use grass with a darker hue. To improve fixation, the grass is intertwined with 22 million artificial fibres. Ultraviolet lights are used nightly to ensure that all parts of the pitch will receive equal lighting; the field is exposed to only two hours of direct sunlight per day.

World Sports uses a blend of three cultivars from DLF-Trifolium, Ph.D. Ryegrass Perenne, from Oregon, US. DLF states that this grass has strong cold and wear tolerance and is disease resistant, combined with fast growth rate. The hue is 8.7 on a scale of 1 to 9, where 9 is dark green. The choice of using ryegrass instead of the most common and usually recommended Bermuda brought advantages like having longitudinal roots, avoiding the cleats to tangle with them, and resistance to yellowing. Because the temperature in São Paulo rarely falls below , a heating system is not used.

The drainage system has two operating modes; gravitational and vacuum-enhanced (Subair System). The irrigation system has individual sprinkler controls, which are controlled by a computerised system. The system comprises 48 sprinklers—twice the minimum FIFA recommendation.

Information technology and communications 

The stadium will have wi-fi and 4G LTE in all its sectors. Using smartphones, the public will be able to access game statistics and watch replays that will be published on a website maintained by the stadium crew. A dedicated team will control centrally all the screens and scoreboards. Supporters will be monitored by a computer system connected to hundreds of security cameras. All services are contracted with Sonda IT.

Hospitality and stores 

There are plans for 75 barsincluding 13 in the VIP areastwo restaurants and two sport bars in the stadium. All the restaurants and bars are managed by Diverti Arena on a 10-year contract. Diverti is expected to invest R$40 million in the stadium; all the properties will be fully operational in 2015. Other commercial properties inside the stadium complex are two clothing stores and kiosks whose operators have not yet been decided upon.

Reception 

The project received awards for the Best Commercial Project and the Grand Prize as the Best Overall Project in Brazil in the largest Corporate Architecture events in Latin America in 2011; it competed against 1,116 projects. Reception by Corinthians supporters was enthusiastic according to a poll, with 83% approval of the stadium. Opposition fans have good approval rates of the stadium. Hundreds of supporters frequently visited the construction site.

Transport 

The nearest subway station is Corinthians-Itaquera,  from the stadium. It connects to a railway station with the same name. If all the stadium's users boarded trains to leave it, the stadium would be empty in 30 minutes. Created for World Cup matches, an express train connects Luz and the Corinthians-Itaquera CPTM Station, making the trip in 17 minutes. Because of its success, the service was extended to local matches, renamed to 'Expresso Corinthians'. The metro and train stations can accommodate 114,000 passengers per hour. Each metro train can carry 1,600 passengers; trains depart at 85-second intervals.

The site has 1,620 covered parking spaces and 929 open air parking spaces, with another 2,214 spaces provided by a shopping mall nearby. There are 61 bus routes that stop close to Arena Corinthians.

Other uses 

Corinthians does not plan to host concerts or other sport events in the stadium because the use for non-football events can destroy the pitch and football ticket sales will compensate for the loss of revenue. The club plans to use the structure to host conventions and trade shows, and to promote tours of the stadium. A  convention centre will be located under the west building.

In popular culture

EA Sports added all 12 venues used at the 2014 FIFA World Cup, including the Arena Corinthians, to the 2014 FIFA World Cup Brazil video game.

The Arena Corinthians is featured on You Don't Have to Live Like a Referee, the sixteenth episode of the 25th season of the American animated sitcom The Simpsons, and the 546th episode of the series. Homer Simpson acts as a FIFA World Cup 2014 referee in a game played at Arena Corinthians.

The second episode of Discovery Channel's three-episode series Building the World Cup is dedicated to Arena Corinthians.

The Netflix show 3% used the stadium's marble big halls and platforms as a shooting location.

Controversies 

The circumstances in which Arena Corinthians was chosen as the World Cup stadium for São Paulo, and the resources used for its construction, have been criticised.

World Cup hosts 

Jose Serra, governor of São Paulo in 2007, planned to bring the opening game to his state—specifically to the Morumbi Stadium—as soon as Brazil was confirmed as the host nation of FIFA World Cup 2014. Mayor Gilberto Kassab supported the option of Morumbi and was assured that president Luis Inácio da Silva wanted the same. Unhappy with Morumbi, FIFA's secretary general Jérôme Valcke said the Morumbi Stadium could not host the opening game and was the worst among the 12 venues presented to FIFA. He recommended that the city should build a new stadium. FIFA technicians stated that the maximum capacity of the current structure would be 46,000 spectatorsbelow the FIFA minimum of 60,000. São Paulo Futebol Clube's director João Paulo de Jesus Lopes said this was "a lie". FIFA's president Sepp Blatter stated that Morumbi could not host the opening game or semifinals without an extensive renovations plan.

The Morumbi Stadium failed to provide proof of funding for a R$630 million renovation plan requested by FIFA to secure its status as a World Cup venue; the stadium was then excluded from the tournament on 16 June 2010. The Local World Cup Committee suggested to use Arena Corinthians instead. FIFA accepted the suggestion and confirmed the decision on 10 October 2011. Journalist Wagner Vilaron from O Estado de S. Paulo deemed the exclusion of the Morumbi Stadium from the World Cup and the subsequent choice of Arena Corinthians as a venue for the event to be politically charged. After receiving several negative responses from FIFA about the renovation project for Morumbi, then-CBF-president Ricardo Teixeira lost patience with São Paulo Futebol Clube officers; he considered that they were delaying the decision by purposely failing to meet the requirements to force the government to spend money on the construction. São Paulo's opposition to Teixeira in the now defunct Clube dos 13 electionwhich was won by ruling-side Fábio Koff, aligned with São Paulo's Juvenal Juvêncioirritated the CBF president. At the same time, an affinity between Teixeira and then-president of Corinthians, Andrés Sanchezwho was chosen as the head of delegation for the national team during the 2010 FIFA World Cup and on the same side on Clube dos 13's electionwas noticed.

São Paulo's mayor Gilberto Kassab supported the selection of the Morumbi Stadium and guaranteed that president Luis Inácio da Silva wanted the same; he blamed FIFA for vetoing the selection. He said Corinthians could not influence FIFA and that CBF wanted Morumbi Stadium to host the opening game. The senior management of São Paulo F.C. criticised the chosen stadium and the selection process on numerous occasions after Morumbi Stadium was excluded from the World Cup. President Juvenal Juvencio said the region had no city structures, hospitals or hotels; the only way to enter or leave the area would be to use a fire engine and that there was no way to create a VIP area around the stadium. Juvenal blamed ex-governor José Serra for Morumbi Stadium's deselection. Serra denied the accusations.

Carlos Miguel Aidar, then a candidate for the SPFC presidency, said Arena Corinthians exists because Brazil's president demanded the construction of a new stadium in São Paulo; he also said Corinthians will never repay the loans for the stadium, that Odebrecht was the real owner, that FIFA and the Brazilian government only wanted to make money for construction companies, and that Itaquera was "another world, another country, nobody can get there". Later he visited the Arena by car, recanted his opinion and said the stadium was "marvelous" and could be reached easily.

Public funding allegations 

Vinícius Segalla from UOL said tax credits and BNDES resources are public money and that the concession of those resources to Corinthians are unclear. The federal government dismissed the notion, saying that tax credits are intended to encourage economical growth and work opportunities for the areas surrounding the stadia. The city government said tax credits are not subsidies and the stadium will be a boon to the city, especially the east zone. They also said subsidies given to the Brazilian Grand Prix and Carnaval among others also bring benefits to the city. Public Prosecutor Marcelo Milani contested the validity of tax credits issued by the city and sued then-mayor Gilberto Kassab for R$1.74 billion; the judges said Milani's case was without merit and dismissed it.

Project changes 

The project executed is not the project approved by the city council in 2011. Amendments were made to the final project, which was submitted on 25 July 2013 and approved on 13 February 2014.

Construction accidents 

Two people were killed in an accident on 27 November 2013, which destroyed part of the east building. A crane fell while carrying a part of the roof, destroying eight columns of the LED screen and part of an internal slab. The structure was not affected because anti-vandalism glass was installed on the east façade. Initial hypotheses were human error, crane mechanical failure and unstable ground under the crane. Liebherr said the crane's "black box" data recorder did not record anything on the day of the accident, although it should have.

, the case has not yet been concluded. Liebherr paid for a study from the Federal University of Rio de Janeiro, which concluded that the cause was unstable ground the same conclusion reached by police experts; based on this, police indicted nine construction workers. Odebrecht refuted the conclusions, and showed a study by private company Geocompany as proof. Another report on the incident provided by IPT/University of São Paulo blamed the accident on the counterweights being heavier than what was specified on the rigging plan. Crane operations in the stadium were suspended at the time; all cranes on the site were inspected and approved to continue work 16 days later. The families of the deceased workers received R$2.9 million in compensation.

Another worker died in an accident on the site while working on the temporary seating. Local authorities' initial assessment was that the worker caused the accident by not following the required safety procedures. , an investigation into the death was underway.

References

External links 

 Arena Corinthians official website
 Odebrecht Arena Corinthians official website
 Images tagged Arena Corinthians at Flickr
 
 Arena Corinthians 3D Model Picture Gallery
 
 Illustrated article about Arena Corinthians

Sport Club Corinthians Paulista
Sports venues in São Paulo
Football venues in São Paulo
2014 FIFA World Cup stadiums
Venues of the 2016 Summer Olympics
Olympic football venues
Sports venues completed in 2014
Tourist attractions in São Paulo
2014 establishments in Brazil
Stadiums that have hosted a FIFA World Cup opening match